KF Hajvalia, commonly known as Hajvalia was a professional football club based in village Hajvalia of Pristina, Kosovo. The club last played in the First Football League of Kosovo, which is the second-tier of football in the country.

History

Trying to buy Luis Suárez
In June 2014 after Luis Suárez was suspended from FIFA because of the bite that made to Giorgio Chiellini. Hajvalia sent an offer the Liverpool for Suárez with a four month duration as much as his four-month suspension from football was. The offer was £24,000 (€30,000) and a salary of €1,500 for each month.

Honours

Notes and references

Notes

References

External links
 
KF Hajvalia at Soccerway

Association football clubs established in 1947
1999 establishments in Kosovo
Association football clubs established in 1999
Association football clubs disestablished in 2018
Football clubs in Kosovo
Defunct football clubs in Kosovo